The Janesville Jets are a Tier II junior ice hockey team in the North American Hockey League.  Based in Janesville, Wisconsin, their home games are played at the Janesville Ice Arena.

History

The Jets name was chosen by a name-the-team contest. Choices were Jackals, Jaguars, Jayhawks, Jets, and Juggernauts, having been whittled down from over 200 original submissions. The Jets name and logo were announced on June 5, 2009, with "Jets" taking 35% of the vote. The name is the name as a previous Janesville hockey team, which played in the former Continental Hockey League in the 1981–82 season. The logo was designed by Tony DiNicola and Christy Kapellen.

The first home game of the 2010–11 season on October 9 was against the Chicago Hitmen. In the 2011–12 season, the Jets were moved from the North Division to a newly formed Midwest Division, along with the St. Louis Bandits and Springfield Jr. Blues.

The Jets unveiled new uniforms for the 2014–15 season, featuring a home gold jersey. In the regular season the Jets set NAHL records for total wins (49), total points (100), and fewest goals against (114). Additionally, forward Zach LaValle set the franchise record for individual scoring. In the postseason, the Jets defeated the Michigan Warriors and the Soo Eagles to capture the North Division title before losing to the eventual Robertson Cup Champions, the Minnesota Wilderness.

In the summer of 2015, the NAHL's divisional realignment moved the Jets into the Midwest Division, joining the Fairbanks Ice Dogs, Kenai River Brown Bears, Minnesota Wilderness, Coulee Region Chill, and the Springfield Jr. Blues.

The Jets finished in second place in the Midwest Division in 2015–16. The team was defeated in the playoffs by the Minnesota Wilderness.

Season-by-season records

Janesville Jets (1981–82)
The Janesville Jets were also a hockey team that played in the Continental Hockey League (CnHL) in 1981–82.

References

External links 
Janesville Jets official website
NAHL website

North American Hockey League teams
North American Hockey League
Janesville, Wisconsin
Amateur ice hockey teams in Wisconsin
Ice hockey clubs established in 2009
2009 establishments in Wisconsin